Pasquale Marigliano (born 7 March 1965) is an Italian lightweight rower. He won a gold medal at the 1995 World Rowing Championships in Tampere with the lightweight men's coxless pair.

References

1965 births
Living people
Italian male rowers
World Rowing Championships medalists for Italy
Olympic rowers of Italy
Rowers at the 1988 Summer Olympics